Satyaban Roy  was an Indian politician. He was elected to the Lok Sabha, the lower house of the Parliament of India from the Uluberia in West Bengal as a member of the Indian National Congress.

References

External links
Official biographical sketch in Parliament of India website

1898 births
Indian National Congress politicians
India MPs 1952–1957
Lok Sabha members from West Bengal
People from Howrah district
Year of death missing